Vilar de Mouros is a civil parish ("freguesia") in the municipality of Caminha, Portugal. The population in 2011 was 753, in an area of 10.38 km2. Located on the banks of the Coura, 7 km from the municipal seat, it became famous as the location of the oldest rock festival in Portugal - the Vilar de Mouros Festival.

References

Freguesias of Caminha